Julian I may refer to:

Didius Julianus, Roman emperor in 193
Julian (Chalcedonian patriarch of Antioch), bishop in 471–476
Julian I (Miaphysite patriarch of Antioch), bishop in 591–595